Gabbasovo (Ğäbbäs) is a rural locality (a village) in Muynaksky Selsoviet, Zianchurinsky District, Bashkortostan, Russia. The population was 118 as of 2010. There is 1 street.

Geography 
Gabbasovo is located 42 km southeast of Isyangulovo (the district's administrative centre) by road. Umbetovo is the nearest rural locality.

References 

Rural localities in Zianchurinsky District